The canton of Pechbonnieu is an administrative division of the Haute-Garonne department, southern France. It was created at the French canton reorganisation which came into effect in March 2015. Its seat is in Pechbonnieu.

It consists of the following communes:
 
Azas
Bazus
Bonrepos-Riquet
Castelmaurou
Garidech
Gauré
Gémil
Gragnague
Labastide-Saint-Sernin
Lapeyrouse-Fossat
Lavalette
Montastruc-la-Conseillère
Montberon
Montjoire
Montpitol
Paulhac
Pechbonnieu
Roquesérière
Rouffiac-Tolosan
Saint-Geniès-Bellevue
Saint-Jean-Lherm
Saint-Loup-Cammas
Saint-Marcel-Paulel
Saint-Pierre
Verfeil
Villariès

References

Cantons of Haute-Garonne
States and territories established in 2015